Nephroptosis,  is rare and abnormal condition in which the kidney drops down into the pelvis when the patient stands up. It is more common in women than in men. It has been one of the most controversial conditions in terms of both its diagnosis and its treatments.

Symptoms and signs
Nephroptosis is asymptomatic in most persons. However, nephroptosis can be characterized by violent attacks of colicky flank pain, nausea, chills, hypertension, hematuria and proteinuria. Persons with symptomatic nephroptosis often complain of sharp pains that radiate into the groin. Many persons also suggest a weighing feeling on the abdomen. Pain is typically relieved by lying down. It is believed that flank pain on standing that is relieved by lying down is due to movement of the kidney causing intermittent renal tract obstruction. The attack of colic pain is called 'Dietl's crisis' or 'renal paroxysm'.

Cause
It is believed to result from deficiency of supporting inferior pararenal fasciae.

Diagnosis
Diagnosis is contemplated based upon patient symptoms. Diagnosis is confirmed during intravenous urography, by obtaining erect and supine films. The renal DMSA scan may show decreased counts in the sitting position compared with supine scan.

Treatment
Nephropexy was performed in the past to stabilize the kidney, but presently surgery is not recommended in asymptomatic patients. A Nephropexy does not guarantee the symptoms will go away. Laparoscopic nephropexy has recently become available for selected symptomatic patients.

References

Further reading

External links 

Kidney diseases